Grzegorz Michał Eitel (born January 14, 1981 in Warsaw) is a Polish judoka.

Achievements

References

External links
 
 Video footage of Grzegorz Eitel at Judovision

1981 births
Living people
Polish male judoka
Judoka at the 2004 Summer Olympics
Olympic judoka of Poland
Sportspeople from Warsaw
20th-century Polish people
21st-century Polish people